Ram Kumar (born 4 February 1964) is a former Indian basketball player and coach of the junior Indian team. He is currently the coach of the Rail Coach Factory, Kapurthala team, and has been a long-standing coach of the Indian Railways men's team. He played for India during 1985 to 1996 and represented the Indian national basketball team at several international championships. He also served as the captain of Indian national basketball team from 1991 to 1995. He played the position of shooting guard. In the National Championships, Ram Kumar represented Indian Railways and during his playing days, Indian Railways won eight Gold, three Silver, and three Bronze medals. Ram Kumar is the son of former basketball player Khushi Ram, an Arjuna awardee and the brother of Ashok Kumar, also an India international player. Considered India's best all-time shooter, he is the 2003 recipient of India's highest sporting honor, the Dhyan Chand Award for lifetime achievement in sports.

Career
He started his career in the year 1983, when he played his first National Championship at Calicut. Ram Kumar first joined income tax department in Jaipur and later moved to Western Railway in the year 1987. He followed his father Khushi Ram's footsteps and became a basketball player. He was honoured by prestigious Dhyan Chand Award in the year 2003 and also Maharana Pratap Award in the year 1989 for being the best sportsman of Rajasthan. Kumar was top scorer at many national and international championships for India. His younger brother Ashok Kumar was also former international basketball player and former India captain.

Kumar after his retirement in 2003 is serving as the coach of "Indian Railways Basketball Team" and has also coached India Junior Basketball Team in year 2003 and 2004 that played at Kuwait and Bangladesh where the Indian team won silver medal. He is currently working as a Senior Sports Officer at Rail Coach Factory at Kapurthala. In 2010, he was the coach of Indian team that won the Asia zone qualifying round for the 21st "FIBA Asia Cup Basketball Championship" to be held at Yemen and coached the Under-18 Indian National Basketball Team at Junior Asian Basketball Championship held at Tehran in 2004 .

Achievements in international fields:

Top scorer of tournament at world railway games in New Delhi in 1987
Best player in S.A.F Games in Colombo in 1991
Best scorer from India at Asian basketball championship at Seoul in 1995
Top 3 point shooter at Asian basketball championship at Bangkok in 1987
Top scorer in world railway games at Romania in 1991
Best shooter at test matches played against U.S.A at New York in 1992

Awards and honors
Dhyan Chand Award (2003)
Maharana Pratap Award (1989)
Rail Minister Award (1994)

References

External links 

 Basketball Stats

1964 births
Living people
Indian men's basketball players
Basketball players from Rajasthan
Recipients of the Dhyan Chand Award
Indian sports coaches
Shooting guards